Lourival Rodrigues Assis Filho (born 3 February 1984) is a Brazilian football midfielder who currently plays for Fluminense de Feira.

He has previously played for Iraty, Kalmar, Avaí, América RN, Botafogo SP, Chernomorets Burgas, Gabala, Bragantino and CRAC.

Career

Gabala
In August 2012, Assis joined Gabala of the Azerbaijan Premier League on a three-year contract. Assis made his debut came on 4 August 2012 against Simurq coming on as a 60th-minute substitute. Assis played a total of 30 games in all competitions, scoring 6 goals to be the seasons joint top goal scorer with Victor Mendy.

Career statistics

References

External links
 

1984 births
Living people
Brazilian footballers
Brazilian expatriate footballers
Iraty Sport Club players
Kalmar FF players
Avaí FC players
América Futebol Clube (RN) players
Botafogo Futebol Clube (SP) players
PFC Chernomorets Burgas players
Expatriate footballers in Sweden
Expatriate footballers in Bulgaria
Expatriate footballers in Azerbaijan
Brazilian expatriate sportspeople in Bulgaria
Association football midfielders
Campeonato Brasileiro Série A players
Campeonato Brasileiro Série B players
Allsvenskan players
First Professional Football League (Bulgaria) players
Azerbaijan Premier League players
Gabala FC players
Villa Nova Atlético Clube players